Manjhipur is a village in the Saharanpur district of Uttar Pradesh, India.

References 

Villages in Saharanpur district